The Honeydrippers: Volume One is an EP released on 24 September 1984, by a band led by rock singer Robert Plant. The project originated when Atlantic Records president Ahmet Ertegun wanted to record an album of his favourite songs from the 1950s. Plant was chosen because Ertegun had seen his pick-up band the Honeydrippers performing 1950s standards. Included in the band were Chic front man Nile Rodgers, Late Night with David Letterman bandleader Paul Shaffer, and former Yardbirds guitarists Jeff Beck and Jimmy Page—the latter was also Plant's former bandmate in Led Zeppelin.

Robert Plant has stated that this is his personal favorite project that he ever recorded. 

The album was re-released in a remastered edition in 2007 as part of a Robert Plant remaster series, with the live version of "Rockin' at Midnight" (previously released on the 12-inch single version of the studio recording) included as a bonus track. Plant and Ertegun discussed the possibility of doing another Honeydrippers album, but with the latter's death in December 2006, the plan was shelved permanently.

Track listing

2007 remaster bonus tracks 
"Rockin' at Midnight" (live in Birmingham NEC, September 8, 1985) – 4:14

1984 Compact disc edition
Same track listing and order as the vinyl release.

Personnel 
 Robert Plant – vocals
 Jeff Beck – guitars ("I Got a Woman," and "Rockin' at Midnight")
 Jimmy Page – guitars ("Sea of Love" and "I Get a Thrill")
 Nile Rodgers – rhythm guitar
 Paul Shaffer – piano
 Dave Weckl – drums
 Wayne Pedzwater – bass
 Keith Evans – saxophone ("Rockin' at Midnight")

Bonus track personnel 
 Robert Plant – vocals
 Robbie Blunt – guitar
 Paul Martinez – bass
 Jezz Woodroffe – keyboards
 Richie Hayward – drums

The King Bees (a.k.a. The Uptown Horns) – horns 
 Crispin Cioe: alto saxophone, baritone saxophone
 Bob Funk: trombone
 Arno Hecht: tenor saxophone
 Paul Litteral: trumpet

The Queen Bees – backing vocals 
 Ula Hedwig
 Chrissie Faith
 Millie Whiteside

Production 
Producers:   Nugetre (Ahmet Ertegun) and the Fabulous Brill Brothers (Robert Plant & Phil Carson)

Charts

Album

Singles

Certifications

References 

The Honeydrippers albums
Albums produced by Ahmet Ertegun
1984 debut EPs
Atlantic Records EPs
Covers EPs